Arlington Park in Birmingham, Alabama, also known as Arlington-West End Historic District, is a historic district which was listed on the National Register of Historic Places in 1926. The contributing buildings were all built during 1920 to 1929.

The district is L-shaped and includes 800-840 First St. W., 815-909 Second St. W. and 100-269 Munger Ave. It is adjacent to Birmingham's only antebellum farmhouse, the Mudd-Munger House, also known as "Arlington", and is on lands formerly part of that farm/estate.  It is bounded "on the southeast by the tracks of the Southern (now Norfolk-Southern) Railroad, on the west by Fourth Street (earlier Montevallo Road), on the north by Cotton Avenue, and on the east by the alley between First and Center Streets West. Interior boundaries are formed by McMillon Avenue and Second Street that border the Arlington House's grounds."

It includes a work by architects Miller, Martin & Lewis, the Munger-Barr House, at 815 Second Street, built in 1920.  It is a two-and-a-halfstorey English or Tudor-influenced house, butilt for Robley Charles Munger.

It includes a stucco-over-concrete block house built as a demonstration house by the Lehigh Portland Cement Company.

References

		
National Register of Historic Places in Jefferson County, Alabama
Tudor Revival architecture in the United States
Mission Revival architecture in Alabama